Molina's hog-nosed skunk, also called the Andes skunk (Conepatus chinga), is a skunk species from South America. It is found in Argentina, Bolivia, Brazil, Chile, Peru, Paraguay, and Uruguay, at elevations up to 5000 m.

Habitat
The Molina's hog-nosed skunk's native range is throughout mid to southern South America, Chile, Peru, northern Argentina, Bolivia, Paraguay, Uruguay, and southern Brazil. The mammal is therefore associated with temperate regions and open areas, mainly described as the Pampas biome and preferring to live in open vegetation, shrub forest and rocky sloped areas.

Population and distribution
Typically they will live alone in an average home range size of about 1.66 individuals/km2 with some overlapping and about six skunks per 3.5 km2. Although living in mostly solitary areas, the skunks will come together temporarily for mating purposes.

Diet
Foraging mainly at night, the skunk is omnivorous, eating birds, small mammals, eggs, insects, leaves, and fruit. The tooth morphology in the Molina's hog-nosed skunk, is different from most mammals in that their teeth are adapted to their omnivorous diet with grinding being the main function of the carnassial apparatus.

Conservation status
The skunk is listed as "least concerned" according to the IUCN Red List. The main threats of the skunk are increased habitat destruction and fragmentation from over exploitation of humans and grazing of agriculture. The skunk is also affected by the planning of new roads and road-kills. Due to improper planning, habitat destruction, and fragmentation, the skunk has started living around man-made structures and along fences and buildings.

References

Skunks
Mammals of Argentina
Mammals of Brazil
Mammals of Bolivia
Mammals of Chile
Mammals of Paraguay
Mammals of Peru
Mammals of Uruguay
Mammals described in 1782